Operation Lilliput (World War II) was the name given to a convoy operation directed by G.H.Q. Operations Instructions Number 21 of 20 October 1942 for transportation of troops, weapons, and supplies in a regular transport service between Milne Bay and Oro Bay, New Guinea between 18 December 1942 and June 1943 in order "to cover reinforcement, supply, and development of the Buna-Gona area upon its anticipated capture" by the Australian 7th Division and the United States Army's 32d Division. Within six months, the convoys, escorted by Royal Australian Navy corvettes and largely composed of Dutch KPM merchant ships, had delivered 60,000 tons of supplies and 3,802 troops from Milne Bay to Oro Bay. Corvettes provided the majority of the escort force.

Oro Bay

Destroyers had been requested as convoy escorts by General Blamey, Commander, Allied Land Forces, but rejected by Vice Admiral Arthur S. Carpender commanding Allied Naval Forces noting the entire area between Cape Nelson and Buna was so filled with reefs that destroyers would be limited in maneuver and not effective against Japanese forces with clear sea room from bases in Rabaul. Further, requirements preliminary to the Guadalcanal operation required fleet units be on standby south of New Guinea. Thus the convoys would only have small, shallow draft warships for escort. A part of the Buna-Gona general plan was development of a deep water port in Oro Bay with a road to be constructed to an airfield to be developed for logistics and as a bomber base at Dobodura.

In the meantime, jeeps were used over jungle trails to deliver supplies. Over 50 air raids were experienced in the first six months and construction of wharves were started in mid 1943 as Operation Lilliput itself was coming to a close, and eight docks, some capable of supporting larger ships, were available by the first of August. After the Lilliput convoys ended, the port was developed into a major facility with machine shops, additional large ship dockage, a slipway of logs capable of handling small vessels and by August 1944 a  wooden pier capable of supporting four Liberty ships at once.

Convoy operations
Operation Lilliput was not an isolated operation as in a single landing or convoy series. It grew from very limited and difficult sea transport in support of the Buna campaign, the very serious lack of supplies for that campaign and had a parallel operation, using some of the same ships over essentially the same route. Convoys of similar nature continued after the formal Operation Lilliput stages had officially ended.

Small Ships Predecessor

Prior to Lilliput convoy operations, the route had been used, and explored, by the Small Ships Section vessels providing both initial invasion and post invasion logistics support. The route had never been accurately charted and was described by Colonel, later Brigadier General, Thomas B. Wilson, Chief of Transportation, as "the most dangerous coastline in the world" with the pre-war route for Australian vessels avoiding the route in favor of one by way of Rabaul and the Solomon Sea into the north coast of New Guinea. Some 250 Small Ships vessels had been ordered into Milne Bay in October 1942 for support of the Buna area that had previously only been reached by air. These vessels, described as "schooners, motorships, motor launches, cabin cruisers, ketches, trawlers, barges, and miscellaneous vessels, most of which were ancient and rusty. Their Australian crews rigged sails when the engines broke down, and made emergency repairs when the hulls were punctured with bullets or jagged coral" had landed elements of the invasion force and provided logistical support—and "moved at night through uncharted waters, marking reefs with empty oil drums and keeping records of observations and soundings, which were later used in charts" after hiding in rivers by day.

Finding a way
In addition to surveys, the vessel was to install lights, land shore parties for reconnaissance, establish radio stations and pilot ships through discovered channels. By the time troops had been airlifted in and secured the area on 5–6 October Paluma had completed survey of a route and supplies began to arrive by water. By early November, Paluma had found a route for large ships around Cape Nelson whereupon the larger vessels discharged at Porlock with the luggers concentrating on transport forward from there.

Lilliput
The urgent need for buildup of logistical support and supplies for the campaign and a base for future operations forced risking larger ships in these hazardous waters. In discussions during the first days of November 1942, New Guinea Force Headquarters decided that cargo vessels would be combat loaded in Australia, proceed to Port Moresby, then Milne Bay and then sent in small "flights" with an escort and one or two cargo vessels for the dangerous run to Oro Bay. Five cargo vessels and Arunta went into Port Moresby with the cargo vessels, Japara, Balikpapan, Bantam and J. B. Ashe escorted by the corvettes going on to Milne Bay for the first run to Buna, but delays in the Buna campaign forced holding of the ships into December with the Port Moresby ships unloading troops and cargo there and returning to Australia.

Karsik then returned on the 14th with a second load of tanks for the forces at Buna. Karsiks first trip with tanks to Oro Bay was named "Operation Karsik" and the second as "Operation Tramsik" and immediately preceded the Lilliput convoys. On 18 December, Japara, under escort of Lithgow, departed in the inauguration of the regular Milne Bay to Oro Bay route, arriving on the 20th, that was with few exceptions run with the Dutch vessels. In the end, most of the KPM vessels of the local fleet had been engaged in the operation.

The operation concluded on 17 June 1943 with "Stage 40", when the U.S. Liberty ship Key Pittman returned to Milne Bay. After Lilliput's official conclusion on 5 July, six similar convoys were run.

Concurrent with Lilliput was Operation Accountant, the transport of elements of the 162nd Regiment of the United States 41st Division to Buna-Gona, that involved some of the same ships and escorts. Those were the escorts Ballarat, Bendigo, Echuca and Kapunda and the transports Bontekoe, Karsik and Van Heemskerk.

Vessels
The Dutch vessels had been acquired through the Netherlands Government in London. Final negotiations between the War Shipping Administration (WSA) and the Dutch government resulted in their being placed under U.S. Army control through a complex charter arrangement in which the British Ministry War Transport (BMWT) chartered the KPM vessels, manned by Dutch officers and Indonesian crew, and jointly with WSA allocated them to the Southwest Pacific Area command's U.S. Army Services of Supply (USASOS) with the stipulation they be under total control of the U.S. Army.

In a footnote, Gill lists the Lilliput vessels as below with the U.S. Army assigned "X" numbers in parenthesis added from Masterson's Appendix 30.

The ships which took part in LILLIPUT were: RAN corvettes—, ; American submarine chasers SC-746 and SC-750; merchant ships—Anhui (X-6), Balikpapan (X-28), Bontekoe (X-13), Both (X-15), Hanyang (X-8), Janssens (X-24),  (X-18),  (X-20), Key Pittman, Lorinna, Maatsuyker (X-12), Patras (X-52), Reijnst (X-48), Swartenhondt (X-14),  (X-16), Thedens, Van den Bosch (X-23),  (X-11), Van Outhoorn (X-54), Van Spilbergen (X-29), Van Swoll (X-50), Yochow (X-7).

Ship losses
 's Jacob and her escort Bendigo bound for Oro Bay had just passed Karsik and Kapunda off Porlock Harbour on their return to Milne Bay on 8 March when at one in the afternoon nine Japanese bombers escorted by 12 fighters attacked  's Jacob. She caught fire and sunk 16 minutes later. Five died and 153 survivors were picked up by Bendigo with two of those dying of injuries. Another flight attacked Karsik without success.

Bantam was unloading at the Oro Bay wharf on 28 March when 18 bombers and 40 fighters struck the port. Her escort, Bowen, was on antisubmarine patrol. Bantam was hit three times and was beached in a badly damaged state and later declared a loss. In the same raid the U.S. Army bareboat chartered ship Masaya, an ex-World War I destroyer and banana boat converted as a fast transport, was hit and sunk  to the east.

Van Heemskerk is not listed above, but was also part of the original 21 KPM ships joining the SWPA fleet and sunk 14 April 1943. The loss of Van Heemskerk in Milne Bay is noted as the cause for cancellation of one Lilliput convoy. The ship, Stage 28 of Operation Lilliput, was caught in a raid of 30 high altitude bombers, 10 dive bombers and an undetermined number of fighters just after her arrival in the bay and hit by dive bombers to become the last casualty of the operation. Despite efforts of the escort Wagga, fires could not be controlled and the ship blew up.

Summary
In the early stages, from December 1942 through February 1943, 12 Dutch ships and eight escorts delivered 40,000 tons of supplies and 2,400 troops in 18 individual voyages. Over the total period into mid-June 1943 with 15 corvettes, two American sub chasers and 24 cargo ships involved, the total became 39 voyages (One cancelled when Van Heemskerk was sunk at Milne Bay) transporting 60,000 tons of supplies and 3,802 troops.

Several escorts were damaged and suffered personnel casualties. Three of the ships, all KPM vessels, were lost. Others were damaged in air attacks. The original twenty-one KPM ships that formed the core of the early permanent local fleet of the Southwest Pacific Area's marine logistics had paid a price of one seventh of the original ships.

Notes

References

External links

An Historical Perspective on Logistics—Operation Lilliput The Link: Defence Logistics Magazine (Australia), Issue 3, page 24.
MAGNETIC ISLAND BOAT "PALUMA" WAS ONCE A SUPPORT VESSEL FOR THE COASTWATCHERS DURING WW2
U.S. Army Small Ships Association (photo section) 

World War II operations and battles of the Pacific theatre
South West Pacific theatre of World War II
Papua New Guinea in World War II
Royal Australian Navy
Battles and operations of World War II involving the Netherlands
Battles and operations of World War II involving Papua New Guinea
Battles and operations of World War II involving Australia
World War II merchant ships of the Netherlands
Merchant navy